The 2016–17 Mount St. Mary's Mountaineers men's basketball team represented Mount St. Mary's University during the 2016–17 NCAA Division I men's basketball season. The Mountaineers, led by fifth-year head coach Jamion Christian, played their home games at Knott Arena in Emmitsburg, Maryland as members of the Northeast Conference. They finished the season 20–16, 14–4 in NEC play to win the regular season championship, their first championship in 21 years. In the NEC tournament, they defeated Sacred Heart, Robert Morris, and Saint Francis (PA) to win the tournament championship. As a result, they received the conference's automatic bid to the NCAA tournament. As a No. 16 seed in the East region, they beat New Orleans in the First Four before losing in the first round to No. 1-seeded and ranked Villanova.

Head coach Jamion Christian was named NEC Coach of the Year.

Previous season 
The Mountaineers finished the 2015–16 season 14–19, 10–8 in NEC play to finish in fifth place. They defeated St. Francis Brooklyn in the NEC tournament before losing to Fairleigh Dickinson in the semifinals.

Roster

Schedule and results

|-
!colspan=11 style=| Exhibition
  
|-
!colspan=11 style=| Non-conference regular season

   
|-
!colspan=11 style=| NEC regular season

  

|-
!colspan=11 style=| NEC tournament

|-
!colspan=11 style=| NCAA tournament

References

Mount St. Mary's Mountaineers men's basketball seasons
Mount St. Mary's
Mount St. Mary's
2016 in sports in Maryland
2017 in sports in Maryland